Pertamina Energy Tower was a 99-storey,  proposed skyscraper in Jakarta, Indonesia. It was designed and planned by Skidmore, Owings & Merrill LLP (SOM), a private architecture and engineering company, and it was supposed to be the new HQ of the state-owned energy company Pertamina.

Design
The tower was proposed to have a dual structural system composed of a central reinforced concrete core and a perimeter composite moment frame. The two systems are connected at regular intervals along the height using steel outrigger and belt trusses.

Postponement of the construction

On 20 February 2015, Pertamina Finance Director Arief Budiman, confirmed that further construction of the Pertamina Energy Tower was suspended due to "depressed oil prices."

Restart of a scaled-down tower 
 
CNN reported in 19 April 2016 that a scaled-down 30-storey tower (instead of the original 99 storey) will be restarted by a local state-owned bank PT Bank Negara Indonesia Tbk (BNI).

See also
List of tallest buildings in Jakarta
List of tallest buildings in Indonesia

References 

Skyscraper office buildings in Indonesia
Buildings and structures under construction in Indonesia
Skidmore, Owings & Merrill buildings
Pertamina